Róbert Zeher (born 12 February 1985) is a Slovak football striker who currently plays for Kalša. He also played in the Czech Gambrinus liga for club FC Baník Ostrava.

References

External links
Tatran profile 
FC Baník profile 

1985 births
Living people
Sportspeople from Košice
Slovak footballers
Association football forwards
FC VSS Košice players
SFC Opava players
FC Baník Ostrava players
FK Chmel Blšany players
1. FC Slovácko players
FK Jablonec players
1. FC Tatran Prešov players
FC Lokomotíva Košice players
Slovak expatriate footballers
Expatriate footballers in the Czech Republic
Slovak expatriate sportspeople in the Czech Republic
Czech First League players
Slovak Super Liga players